Little people may refer to:

 People with dwarfism, short stature resulting from a medical condition
 Little People of America, organization representing some of the above
 Little People of Canada, organization representing some of the above
 Children

Culture and media

 Little people (mythology), a folklore archetype
 Little People! (book), a 1991 fantasy fiction anthology
 Little People (toys), a Fisher-Price toy brand
 Little People (TV series), a 2016–2018 animated series based on the toy brand
 The Little People (TV series), later titled The Brian Keith Show, a 1972–1974 American sitcom
 The Little People (film), a 1926 British silent film
 "The Little People" (The Twilight Zone), television series episode
 "Little People", television series episode of Dilbert
 "Little People", song from the musical Les Misérables
 "Little People", song by Todrick Hall from Straight Outta Oz, 2016
 "Little People", song by the White Stripes from The White Stripes, 1999
 The Little People, villains in the novel 1Q84

See also

 Darby O'Gill and the Little People
 Little People, Big World, an American reality television program